Cophixalus balbus is a species of frogs in the family Microhylidae. Molecular data suggest that it might belong to the genus Oreophryne. It is known from the vicinity of its type locality in Yapen island, Papua Province, Indonesia, as well as from the Hunstein Mountains (East Sepik Province) and Bewani and Torricelli Mountains (West Sepik Province) in Papua New Guinea.

Etymology
The specific name balbus is Latin for "stuttering". This refers to its advertisement call: the first part of the call consists of single notes at relative longer intervals, followed by the second part where intervals are shorter and notes come in groups—this gives an impression of stuttering.

Description
Cophixalus balbus are small frogs, though relatively large among Cophixalus: adult males measure  in snout–vent length. Head is large and as wide as long. Ground colour is yellowish-brownish, with dorsal surfaces covered with small warts. There is a conspicuous, dark grey W-shaped mark in the scapular region.

Habitat and conservation
Its natural habitat are patches of primary and secondary rainforest. All specimens were found perched on fern fronds or on shrubs up to 3 m above the ground. The New Guinean records are from  a.s.l.

There are no known threats to this species.

References

balbus
Amphibians of Papua New Guinea
Amphibians of Western New Guinea
Frogs of Asia
Amphibians described in 2003
Taxonomy articles created by Polbot